Matt Focht is an American musician originally from Omaha, Nebraska. He is best known as the lead singer and rhythm guitarist in the Chicago-based band Head of Femur. Matt is currently working on a record with his wife, Crystal Hartford, for the band, Hartford/Focht. Also playing drums in Omaha band, High Up.

Previously, he played with Bright Eyes, Pablo's Triangle, and Opium Taylor.

Album Appearances
Bright Eyes - Letting Off the Happiness (1998 · Saddle Creek)
Bright Eyes - There Is No Beginning to the Story (2002, Saddle Creek)
Bright Eyes - Lifted or The Story is in the Soil, Keep Your Ear to the Ground (2002 · Saddle Creek)
Head of Femur - Ringodom or Proctor (2003 · Greyday Productions)
Head of Femur - Hysterical Stars (2005 · spinART)
Head of Femur - Great Plains (2008 · Greyday Productions)

External links
Head of Femur official website

Year of birth missing (living people)
Living people
American male singers
American rock singers
American indie rock musicians
Musicians from Omaha, Nebraska